Flavio Zanonato (born 24 July 1950 in Padua) is an Italian politician. He is the former mayor of Padua.

Career
A long-time member of the Italian Communist Party and of its successor parties, he joined the Democratic Party.

After two terms as mayor of Padua (1993–1995, when he replaced Paolo Giaretta, and 1995–1999), he was defeated by Giustina Mistrello Destro in 1999. From 2000 to 2004 he was floor leader of the Democrats of the Left in the Regional Council of Veneto, where he was elected as the most voted regional deputy in the 2000 regional election.

In 2004 Zanonato defeated incumbent Giustina Mistrello Destro and was elected for the third time Mayor of Padua with an absolute majority of  51.9% at the first round.

In 2009 Zanonato defeated Marco Marin and was elected mayor of Padua for the fourth time in the second round run off winning 52% of the vote.

In March 2021, at the age of 70, Zanonato graduated in Philosophy at the University of Padua.

Minister of Economic Development, 2013–2014
From April 2013 to February 2014 he was minister of economic development in the cabinet of Prime Minister Enrico Letta.

Member of the European Parliament, 2014–2019
Zanonato became a Member of the European Parliament in the 2014 European elections. In Parliament, he was a member of the Committee on Industry, Research and Energy. In addition to his committee assignments, he served as a member of the European Parliament Intergroup on Western Sahara and the European Parliament Intergroup on Integrity (Transparency, Anti-Corruption and Organized Crime). He joined the Article 1 – Democratic and Progressive Movement in 2017.

See also

References

External links
Official website
 

1950 births
Living people
Article One (political party) politicians
Article 1 – Democratic and Progressive Movement MEPs
Democratic Party (Italy) MEPs
Mayors of Padua
Democratic Party (Italy) politicians
Democrats of the Left politicians
Democratic Party of the Left politicians
20th-century Italian politicians
Government ministers of Italy
Letta Cabinet
MEPs for Italy 2014–2019
21st-century Italian politicians
Members of the Regional Council of Veneto
University of Padua alumni